Hatuniye is a historical külliye, an Islamic religious complex, located in the city center of Tokat, Turkey. Its 1485 construction was ordered by Ottoman Sultan Bayezid II in honour of his mother, Gülbahar Hatun. Its facilities include a mosque, an imaret, and a medrese. At present the mosque is used for prayer and other religious services, while the rest of the complex is open to visits by tourists and the public in general.

Gallery

See also
 Hatuniye Medresesi

References

Tokat
Religious buildings and structures completed in 1485
Buildings and structures in Tokat
Madrasas in Turkey
Buildings and structures of the Ottoman Empire